Plenilune or Full Moon is a 2000 Spanish film directed by Imanol Uribe and written by Elvira Lindo, consisting of an adaptation of the novel Plenilunio by Antonio Muñoz Molina. It stars Miguel Ángel Solá, Adriana Ozores and Juan Diego Botto alongside Fernando Fernán Gómez, Charo López, Chete Lera and María Galiana.

Plot 
Arriving to a sleepy provincial city of northern Spain from the Basque Country, a police inspector with a psychologically damaged wife tracks down (with help from the local coroner) a psychotic misogynist killer of female children, who happens to hate his job as a fishmonger and his family altogether as well. The inspector kindles with Susana Grey, the teacher of a murdered girl, establishing a romantic affair.

Cast

Production 
The screenplay was penned by Elvira Lindo, adapting the novel by Antonio Muñoz Molina. The film is a Sogecine production. It was shot in Palencia, Castile and León. Produced by Andrés Santana, other crew members included  (cinematography) and Teresa Font (editing) and Antonio Meliveo (music).

Release 
The film was presented in September 2000 at the 48th San Sebastián International Film Festival, screened out of competition. Distributed by Warner Sogefilms, it was theatrically released in Spain on 29 September 2000.

Reception 
The screenplay received mixed reviews from critics, whereas the performances earned general acclaim.

Accolades 

|-
| align = "center" rowspan = "2" | 2000 || rowspan = "2" | 47th Ondas Awards || colspan = "2" | Best Spanish Film ||  || rowspan = "2" | 
|-
| Best Actress || Adriana Ozores ||  
|-
| align = "center" rowspan = "6" | 2001 || rowspan = "5" | 15th Goya Awards || Best Actor || Juan Diego Botto ||  || align = "center" rowspan = "5" | 
|-
| Best Actress || Adriana Ozores || 
|-
| Best Original Score || Antonio Meliveo || 
|-
| Best Cinematography || Gonzalo "Kalo" F. Berridi || 
|-
| Best Sound || Gilles Ortion, Ray Gillon, James Muñoz || 
|-
| 10th Actors Union Awards || Best Film Performance in a Leading Role || Adriana Ozores ||  || 
|}

See also 
 List of Spanish films of 2000

References

2000 thriller films
2000s Spanish-language films
Films set in Spain
Films shot in the province of Palencia
Films based on Spanish novels
2000s Spanish films